Olbricht is a surname. Notable people with the surname include:

Alexander Olbricht (1876–1942), German artist
Bernd Olbricht (born 1956), East German sprint canoeist
Friedrich Olbricht (1888–1944), German general during World War II
Thomas H. Olbricht (1929–2020), American religion academics

See also 
 Olbrich